Kentucky Route 2051 (KY 2051) is a  state highway in the U.S. State of Kentucky. Its southern terminus is at U.S. Route 31W (US 31W) and US 60 in Louisville and its northern terminus is at KY 1934 in Louisville.

Major junctions

References

2051
2051
Transportation in Louisville, Kentucky